Widing is a Swedish surname. Notable people with the surname include:

Daniel Widing (born 1982), Swedish ice hockey player
Juha Widing (1947–1984), Swedish ice hockey player

Swedish-language surnames